Bleak Night (lit. "The Lookout") is a 2010 South Korean coming-of-age drama film written and directed by Yoon Sung-hyun. The film is about a father's search for answers following his son's death, and the shifting dynamics at play among three high-school friends. A Korean Academy of Film Arts graduation project by Yoon Sung-hyun, it received rave reviews and won several Best New Actor awards for Lee Je-hoon, as well as Best New Director for Yoon at the Grand Bell Awards and Busan Film Critics Awards.

Plot 
Still mystified by his son's death, the father (Jo Sung-ha) of high school student Ki-tae (Lee Je-hoon) tries to track down his two best friends, classmates Hee-joon (Park Jeong-min) and Dong-yoon (Seo Jun-young), to try to find an explanation. Through Ki-tae's classmate Jae-ho, the father meets Hee-joon, who says he cannot help as he moved schools "weeks before what happened to Ki-tae." Afterwards, Hee-joon berates Jae-ho for giving his phone number to Ki-tae's father but Jae-ho tells him that Ki-tae "went crazy" after he moved away. Hee-joon manages to trace Dong-yoon and urges him to contact Ki-tae's father and provide some answers. In parallel, flashbacks to the time gradually reveal what really happened, starting with Ki-tae's needling and bullying of Hee-joon and the latter's response.

Cast 
 Lee Je-hoon as Ki-tae
 Seo Jun-young as Dong-yoon
 Park Jeong-min as Baek Hee-joon ("Becky")
 Jo Sung-ha as Ki-tae's father
 Bae Jae-ki as Jae-ho
 Lee Cho-hee as Se-jung, girlfriend of Dong-yoon

Awards and nominations

References

External links 
 
 
 
 
 

2010 films
2010s high school films
South Korean independent films
South Korean coming-of-age drama films
2010s teen drama films
South Korean high school films
Films about school violence
Films about bullying
Films about suicide
2010s Korean-language films
2010s coming-of-age drama films
2010 directorial debut films
2010 drama films
2010s South Korean films